The Long Now is the debut studio album by Australian indie rock band Children Collide. The album was produced by David Sardy, and was released by Universal in Australia on 11 October 2008. The Special Collector's Edition of the album features a circle on the cover with a sticker stating: "Scratch the circle to reveal 1 of 3 cover versions."

Track listing

Track Information

The song Skeleton Dance was used in the soundtracks of video games FIFA 10 and NBA 2K11.

Personnel
Johnny Mackay – vocals, guitar
Heath Crawley – bass
Ryan Caesar – drums

Charts

2008 debut albums
Children Collide albums
Albums produced by Dave Sardy